Vesyoly is a rural locality (a khutor) in Kamennomostskoye Rural Settlement of Maykopsky District, Russia. The population was 10 as of 2018. There are 13 streets.

Ethnicity 
The khutor is inhabited by Russians.

References 

Rural localities in Maykopsky District